Spin Records may refer to:
Spin Records (Australian label), founded in 1966  
Spin Records (American label), founded in 1952